The San Francisco and Alameda Railroad (SF&A) was a short-lived railroad company in the East Bay area of the San Francisco Bay Area. The railroad line opened 1864–1865 from Alameda Terminal on Alameda Island to Hayward, California, with ferry service between Alameda Terminal and San Francisco started in 1864. After being bankrupted by the 1868 Hayward earthquake, it was acquired by a subsidiary of the Central Pacific Railroad in August 1869. Part of the SF&A line between Alameda Terminal and San Leandro served as a portion of the First transcontinental railroad starting in September 1869 (though most was replaced by the San Francisco and Oakland Railroad by November 1869), while the southern section was abandoned in 1873.

The remaining part of the line became part of the Southern Pacific Railroad. From 1911 to 1941, the section on Alameda was used for electrified commuter service. Freight service on Alameda lasted until 1960. The middle section of the SF&A line between Fruitvale and San Leandro is still in service as part of the Union Pacific Railroad Niles Subdivision. It is used by Amtrak Capitol Corridor and Coast Starlight passenger trains and Union Pacific freight trains.

History
In 1863 A. A. Cohen, a prominent San Francisco attorney, together with Charles Minturn, an operator of river steamboats and bay ferries, E. B. Mastick, a prominent Alameda landowner, and others incorporated the San Francisco and Alameda Railroad to provide passenger and freight ferry-train service to Alameda, San Leandro, Hayward (then called Haywards) and perhaps farther.

Construction

System construction began in 1864 on a wharf and railroad station (Alameda Terminal) at the foot of Pacific Avenue in Alameda and a railroad from there along Pacific Ave. to 4th St., private right-of-way to 5th St., Linnet St. (later Railroad Ave., then Lincoln Ave.) to Alameda station at Park St. with a few intermediate stations including Mastick, east of 8th St., and Encinal, east of Grand St., named after the neighborhood, but also known as Fasskings after the nearby entertainment pavilion. Service began later that year.

Construction continued via private right-of-way between the Oakland Estuary and San Leandro Bay, (Alameda was then a peninsula rather than an island) to stations named Fruit Vale (later renamed Fernside) at Fernside Blvd. and Pearl St. near the present Fruitvale Bridge, to Simpson's (later renamed Melrose) near the present 48th Ave. and then, turning southeastward, to Fitch's (later named Fitchburg) near the present 77th Ave., to Jones (later Elmhurst) near the present 98th Ave. to the Bay side of San Leandro near Davis St.

At San Leandro, the track turned sharply left (heading east) there onto Ward (now West Estudillo) St. to the SF&A San Leandro station at the intersection with the county road (now East 14th St). The track then turned sharply to the right to follow the county road southward (now East 14th St. in San Leandro, and Mission Blvd. in Hayward). Near Hayward, the track angled to the right on private right-of-way to A St. and Watkins St., following Watkins St. to D St. where a station was built. Service to Hayward started in 1865. There were five trips daily, linking Hayward to San Francisco, and made commuting for Hayward area residents a viable option for the first time.  But with only 30 homes in Hayward at that time, it was not profitable.

Mergers and acquisitions
In 1865, Cohen gained control of the overextended San Francisco and Oakland Railroad. After Central Pacific Railroad decided to make Oakland the western terminus of the First transcontinental railroad in April 1868, its subsidiary purchased the majority of stock in SF&O from Cohen in August 1868. After the October 1868 Hayward earthquake bankrupted SF&A, the CP subsidiary purchased also the majority of stock in SF&A while retaining Cohen on the CP payroll as a lawyer.

By 1866 the Western Pacific Railroad had built a line from San Jose northwest to Vallejo Mills (mouth of Niles Canyon, later Niles and now part of Fremont) and had laid out the rest of the line through the canyon, through Livermore Valley, over Altamont Pass, and on to Stockton and Sacramento, before running out of money. A Central Pacific subsidiary then took control of the Western Pacific, finished building the line, and added a line northwest from Niles toward Oakland. It was determined that the SF&A track north of Hayward with its sharp turns on Ward St. in San Leandro was unsuitable for main-line trains. Thus the Western Pacific connection was made on the Bay side (west of Alvarado and Davis Sts) of San Leandro, establishing a new San Leandro station there and providing a through route to Alameda Pier.  On September 6, 1869, the first transcontinental train to the Bay Area ran through Alameda to Alameda Terminal, where the passengers boarded the ferryboat Alameda to San Francisco. A California Historical Landmark plaque (no. 440) commemorates this event.  Construction was then started on the connection from Simpson's to the SF&O in San Antonio.  When the connection to the SF&O was completed in November, the transcontinental trains operated to Oakland Pier instead. Alameda then went back to local train service only.

In June 1870 the SF&O and SF&A were merged to form the San Francisco, Oakland and Alameda Railroad, which existed for two months before it was brought back into the Central Pacific Railroad.

In 1873 the Central Pacific Railroad made some economy cutbacks.  The Alameda train service now used new track north from Fernside station alongside Fruitvale Avenue to a new Fruitvale station at the junction with the CPRR main line from Oakland south and terminated there. The former SF&A line from San Leandro to Hayward was abandoned, despite the protests from these towns. Track was laid north from Mastick station to a bridge being built across the Oakland Estuary to connect with Alice St. with the tracks continuing along this street to 7th St. so that Alameda trains could continue to Oakland Pier. Alameda Pier (at Pacific Ave.) was no longer used.

In 1887, the Central Pacific Railroad was leased to the Southern Pacific Railroad. In 1898 the Alice St. bridge and tracks to 7th St. in Oakland were replaced by a bridge to Harrison St. with a track connection to the 1st St. line to Oakland Pier. In 1903 the Oakland Tidal Canal was finished, linking the Oakland Estuary with San Leandro Bay, making Alameda into an island, and requiring the construction of the Fruitvale Bridge. In 1906, some Alameda trains started using the newer Alameda Pier, originally built by the South Pacific Coast Railroad, located on the south shore of the Oakland Estuary at the far western end of Alameda.

Later years
In 1911 the Southern Pacific Railroad electrified most of its local lines in the East Bay. The electrified Alameda line, now called the Lincoln Ave. line, went from Alameda Pier via private right of way to Main St, to the original Pacific Ave. tracks, then to Alameda and Fernside stations, and then to a new loop around the eastern end of Alameda to connect with the Encinal Ave. line, originally built by the South Pacific Coast Railroad.

In 1939, Alameda Pier was abandoned and the Lincoln Ave. line continued beyond Alameda station across the Fruitvale Bridge to a connection with the 7th St. line at the later Fruitvale station. The trains then followed the 7th St. line through Oakland and across the San Francisco-Oakland Bay Bridge to the San Francisco Transbay Terminal. This was an indirect route for passengers from western Alameda. Passenger service was abandoned in January, 1941, and replaced by Key System buses using a shorter route via a tunnel (Posey Tube), aligned with Harrison St. in Oakland, but freight service continued over most of the route. The last passenger train on this line was an excursion train, pulled by a steam engine, for the Bay Area Electric Railroad Association in April, 1954. Freight service ended in 1960 and the tracks were removed.

Ferryboats

The first ferryboat used by the SF&A was a river packet named Sophie MacLane, leased from Charles Minturn's company. It soon proved to be too small, so it was returned to Sacramento River service and Minturn moved the Contra Costa, a ferryboat built for service from San Francisco to the foot of Broadway in Oakland, over to the SF&A route. As business built up, even the Contra Costa became inadequate, so the SF&A had a new ferryboat built. It was completed in January 1866, was named Alameda, and was the first double-ended ferryboat on the Bay. After the SF&A was taken over by the Central Pacific Railroad, the Alameda was placed in the pool of CP ferryboats and served in various locations.

Locomotives

The initial order for locomotives was for two of the 2-2-0 type. They arrived in 1864 and one was named E. B. Mastick and the other was sold to a Southern California railroad. Soon after service was started, it was realized that a more powerful locomotive was needed, so the J. C. Kellogg, a 4-4-0 type, was built by the SF&A. In 1868 another 4-4-0 locomotive was ordered and delivered. It was named the F. D. Atherton and was heavily damaged in the wreck at Simpson's the following year, but was rebuilt. When the Central Pacific Railroad took over the SF&A, other locomotives were brought in and the three SF&A locomotives were sent elsewhere on the CP system.

Wreck

On November 14, 1869, the first major railroad accident in California occurred east of Simpson's. The morning eastbound transcontinental train left Oakland Pier, but was delayed. The morning inbound SF&A local left Hayward, but was delayed also. They were scheduled to pass at Simpson's, which was in a heavy fog area that morning. The transcontinental train arrived at Simpson's first and had a confused exchange with the switchman. Assuming that the local had already passed, the transcontinental train proceeded east in the fog at speed and collided with the local train. Among the 15 killed were 4 from the engine crews, and 21 passengers were injured, some seriously. Both locomotives were heavily damaged, but were rebuilt. Several passenger cars were destroyed. An inquest was held which found the switchman to be negligent. He was tried for manslaughter, but found not guilty. A second track was soon built between Simpson's and San Leandro.

See also
 San Francisco and Oakland Railroad
 San Francisco and San Jose Railroad

Notes

References
 
 
 
 
 
 

Defunct California railroads
Passenger rail transportation in California
Predecessors of the Southern Pacific Transportation Company
Public transportation in Alameda County, California
Rail transportation in Oakland, California
History of Oakland, California
First transcontinental railroad